The Pertyoideae are a subfamily of the family Asteraceae of the flowering plants.  It comprises a single tribe, Pertyeae, of six genera.

References

External links

Tolweb Pertyoideae

 
Asterales subfamilies